This list ranks the tallest buildings in the European Union that stand at least  tall, based on standard height measurement. This means that spires and other architectural details are included in the official height, but not antenna masts, as it is defined by the Council on Tall Buildings and Urban Habitat. Only habitable buildings are ranked, which excludes radio masts and towers, observation towers, cathedrals, steeples, chimneys and other tall architectural structures.

Existing buildings

This list includes buildings under construction that have already been architecturally topped out. Architectural height is considered, so masts and other elements added after completion of building are not considered.

Buildings by pinnacle height
Some skyscraper enthusiasts prefer this measurement, claiming that the extensions that can or cannot be deemed "architectural" are subjective. However, many non-architectural extensions (such as radio antennas) are easily added and removed from tall buildings without significantly changing the style and design of the building, which is seen as a significant part of the value of these buildings.

However the height data is subject to fluctuations due to simple changing of mast extensions. This list includes buildings under construction that have already been architecturally topped out.

Buildings under construction
This lists buildings that are under construction in European Union and are planned to rise at least . Approved or proposed buildings are not included in the table. Included are renders of the finished towers or images of the current construction sites.

Timeline of the tallest buildings in the EU/EEC
The following is a timeline of the tallest buildings in the European Union (EU) and its direct predecessor, the European Economic Community (EEC) established in 1957.

Prior to 1966, Edificio España and Torre de Madrid in Madrid surpassed the height of the then tallest EU building, but Spain didn't become a European Union member until 1986. Similarly, before 1990, the Palace of Culture and Science in Warsaw surpassed the height of the then tallest EU building; however, Poland did not become a member of the European Union until 2004.

The Shard ceased to be tallest building in the EU in 2020 due to the United Kingdom exiting the European Union. The title then returned to the previous holder, Frankfurt's Commerzbank Tower.

See also
 List of tallest buildings in Europe

Footnotes and references

Bibliography
 Skyscrapers at Emporis
 Skyscrapers at SkyscraperPage
 Skyscrapers at Structurae

All articles with unsourced statements
European Union-related lists